The 1956–57 Rugby Football League season was the 62nd season of rugby league football.

Season summary
Oldham finished the regular season as the league leaders and then won their fourth Rugby Football League Championship when they beat Hull F.C. 15-14 in the play-off final.

The Challenge Cup winners were Leeds who beat Barrow 9-7 in the final.

Oldham won the Lancashire League, and Leeds won the Yorkshire League. Oldham beat St. Helens 10–3 to win the Lancashire County Cup, and Wakefield Trinity beat Hunslet 23–5 to win the Yorkshire County Cup.

Championship

Play-offs

Challenge Cup

Leeds beat Barrow 9-7 in the Challenge Cup Final played at Wembley Stadium before a crowd of 76,318.

This was Leeds’ eighth Challenge Cup Final win in ten Final appearances. Jeff Stevenson, their scrum half back, was awarded the Lance Todd Trophy for his man-of-the-match performance.

Kangaroo Tour

October until December also saw the appearance of the Australian team in England on their 1956–57 Kangaroo Tour. Other than the three test Ashes series against Great Britain (won 2–1 by Australia), The Kangaroos played 16 matches against club and county representative sides.

The Kangaroos were captain-coached by St George Dragons hooker Ken Kearney.

References

Sources
1956-57 Rugby Football League season at Wigan.rlfans.com
The Challenge Cup at The Rugby Football League website

1956 in English rugby league
1957 in English rugby league
Northern Rugby Football League seasons